Arthur Ellsworth can refer to:

People 

Arthur E. Foote (born 1874), American tennisist
Arthur Ellsworth Summerfield (1899–1972), American politician
A.E. Dick Howard (born 1933), American legal scholar
A. Whitney Ellsworth (1938–2011), American editor and publisher

Books 

Clarence Arthur Ellsworth [1885–1961]; gifted painter of Indians, 1961 book by Bertha Parker Pallan
Clarence Arthur Ellsworth,: Artist of the Old West, 1885–1964, 1967 book by Otha Wearin